Rolando Marciano Chilavert González (born 22 May 1961 in Luque) is a retired football midfielder from Paraguay.

Throughout his career he played for several Paraguayan clubs such as Guaraní (where he was part of the 1984 team that won the Paraguayan Championship), Olimpia and Cerro Porteño, and for Argentine club Chaco For Ever. Rolando Chilavert was part of the Paraguay national football team that competed in the 1986 FIFA World Cup. He played as an attacking midfielder and was known for his creativity and precision in the passes.

After retiring as a player, Chilavert started a coaching career that included teams such as Guaraní and Sol de América (from Paraguay), The Strongest (from Bolivia), and also the youth divisions of the Paraguay national team (Under-17 and Under-20).

Personal life
Rolando is the older brother of famous former goalkeeper José Luis Chilavert.

References

External links
 La Razon article on Chilavert 

1961 births
Living people
Paraguayan footballers
Paraguayan expatriate footballers
Club Guaraní players
Club Olimpia footballers
Paraguay international footballers
Expatriate footballers in Argentina
1986 FIFA World Cup players
Paraguayan football managers
The Strongest managers
Sportspeople from Luque
Expatriate football managers in Bolivia
Expatriate football managers in Peru
Club Guaraní managers
Sportivo Luqueño players
Association football midfielders
12 de Octubre Football Club managers
Ayacucho FC managers
Club Sol de América managers
Sportivo Luqueño managers
León de Huánuco managers